Polk County is a county in the northwestern part of the U.S. state of Minnesota. Its population was 31,192 at the 2020 census. Its county seat is Crookston, and the largest community is East Grand Forks.

Polk County is part of the Grand Forks, ND-MN metropolitan statistical area.

History
In one of its early acts as a state entity, the Minnesota Legislature created the county on July 20, 1858, but did not organize it at that time. The county was named for the 11th president of the United States, James Knox Polk, who signed the congressional act that organized the Minnesota Territory. The county was organized in 1872 and 1873, with the newly settled community of Crookston as the county seat.

Geography
Polk County lies on Minnesota's border with North Dakota (across the Red River). The Red Lake River flows west through the upper central part of the county, discharging into the Red at Grand Forks. The county terrain consists of low, rolling hills, devoted to agriculture. The county slopes to the west and north, with its highest point near its southeast corner, at 1,519 ft (463 m) above sea level.
  USGS surveys show the county's high point to be 1575 ft, 1 km south of U.S. 2, about 2 km east of Spring Lake, at 47.5197°N, 95.5906°W.

Major highways

  U.S. Highway 2
  U.S. Highway 59
  U.S. Highway 75
  Minnesota State Highway 9
  Minnesota State Highway 32
  Minnesota State Highway 92
  Minnesota State Highway 102
  Minnesota State Highway 220

  Polk County State-Aid Highway 21: This is the major connector between Grand Forks and Pennington County, and connects with Pennington County State-Aid Highway 3.
  Polk County State-Aid Highway 9: A major connector between Crookston and the south end of Grand Forks, it connects with Grand Forks County Road 7, and functions as a southside connector between US 75 and US 2 in Crookston.
   Polk County State-Aid Highways 11 & 46: US 2 Truck Bypass of Crookston
  Polk County State-Aid Highway 2:  Designated and designed for heavy truck traffic connecting US 2 to Roseau County and Marshall County.

Adjacent counties

 Marshall County (north)
 Pennington County (northeast)
 Red Lake County (northeast)
 Clearwater County (east)
 Mahnomen County (southeast)
 Norman County (south)
 Traill County, North Dakota (southwest)
 Grand Forks County, North Dakota (west)

Protected areas

 Agassiz Dunes Scientific and Natural Area (part)
 Belgium State Wildlife Management Area
 Brandsvold State Wildlife Management Area
 Castor State Wildlife Management Area
 Enerson State Wildlife Management Area
 Erskine State Wildlife Management Area
 Glacial Ridge National Wildlife Refuge
 Gully Fen Scientific and Natural Area
 Hangaard State Wildlife Management Area
 Hasselton State Wildlife Management Area (part)
 Hill River State Wildlife Management Area
 Kroening State Wildlife Management Area
 Lavoi State Wildlife Management Area
 Lessor State Wildlife Management Area
 Mahgre State Wildlife Management Area
 Malmberg Prairie Scientific and Natural Area
 Pembina State Wildlife Management Area
 Polk State Wildlife Management Area
 Red River State Recreation Area (part)
 Red River Valley Natural History Area
 Rindahl State Wildlife Management Area
 Rydell National Wildlife Refuge
 Sand Hill Recreation Area
 Shypoke State Wildlife Management Area
 Stipa State Wildlife Management Area

Demographics

2000 census
As of the 2000 United States census, 31,369 people, 12,070 households, and 8,050 families were in the county. The population density was 15.9/sq mi (6.14/km2). The 14,008 housing units had an average density of 7.11/sq mi (2.74/km2). The racial makeup of the county was 94.18% White, 0.33% African American, 1.30% Native American, 0.30% Asian, 2.77% from other races, and 1.30% from two or more races. About 4.79% of the population were Hispanics or Latinos of any race; 41.7% were of Norwegian, 19.7% German, and 5.8% French ancestry.

Of the 12,070 households, 32.3% had children under 18 living with them, 54.9% were married couples living together, 8.5% had a female householder with no husband present, and 33.3% were not families. About 28.9% of all households were made up of individuals, and 13.8% had someone living alone who was 65 or older. The average household size was 2.47, and the average family size was 3.07.

The county's age distribution was 25.9% under 18, 9.7% from 18 to 24, 24.8% from 25 to 44, 22.2% from 45 to 64, and 17.4% who were 65 or older. The median age was 38. For every 100 females, there were 98.1 males. For every 100 females 18 and over, there were 95.5 males.

The median income for a household was $35,105, and for a family was $44,310. Males had a median income of $31,472 versus $21,535 for females. The per capita income was $17,279. About 7.3% of families and 10.9% of the population were below the poverty line, including 13.3% of those under age 18 and 10.9% of those 65 or over.

2020 Census

Communities

Cities

 Beltrami
 Climax
 Crookston (county seat)
 East Grand Forks
 Erskine
 Fertile
 Fisher
 Fosston
 Gully
 Lengby
 McIntosh
 Mentor
 Nielsville
 Trail
 Winger

Unincorporated communities

 Benoit
 Cisco
 Dugdale
 Euclid
 Greenview
 Maple Bay
 Olga
 Sherack
 Tabor

Townships

 Andover Township
 Angus Township
 Badger Township
 Belgium Township
 Brandsvold Township
 Brandt Township
 Brislet Township
 Bygland Township
 Chester Township
 Columbia Township
 Crookston Township
 Eden Township
 Esther Township
 Euclid Township
 Fairfax Township
 Fanny Township
 Farley Township
 Fisher Township
 Garden Township
 Garfield Township
 Gentilly Township
 Godfrey Township
 Grand Forks Township
 Grove Park-Tilden Township
 Gully Township
 Hammond Township
 Helgeland Township
 Higdem Township
 Hill River Township
 Hubbard Township
 Huntsville Township
 Johnson Township
 Kertsonville Township
 Keystone Township
 King Township
 Knute Township
 Lessor Township
 Liberty Township
 Lowell Township
 Nesbit Township
 Northland Township
 Onstad Township
 Parnell Township
 Queen Township
 Reis Township
 Rhinehart Township
 Roome Township
 Rosebud Township
 Russia Township
 Sandsville Township
 Scandia Township
 Sletten Township
 Sullivan Township
 Tabor Township
 Tynsid Township
 Vineland Township
 Winger Township
 Woodside Township

Government and politics
Polk County has been a swing district for several decades. As of 2020, it has selected the Republican nominee in presidential elections in 56% of elections since 1980.

See also
 National Register of Historic Places listings in Polk County, Minnesota

References

Further reading
 R.I. Holcombe and William H Bingham, Compendium of History and Biography of Polk County, Minnesota. Minneapolis: W. H. Bingham & Co., 1916.
 Huber D. McLellan, The History of the Early Settlement and Development of Polk County, Minnesota. PhD dissertation. Northwestern University, 1928.
 Polk County Historical Society, Bicentennial History of Polk County, Minnesota: Pioneers of the Valley. n.c.: Polk County Historical Society, 1976.
 Polk County Historical Society, The Polk County Historian. (journal)
 Claude Eugene Wentsel, Polk County, Minnesota, in the World War. Ada, MN: C.E. Wentsel, 1922.
 Winger Golden Jubilee Historical Committee, Golden Jubilee, Winger, Minnesota, 1904-1954.  Winger, MN: Winger Enterprise, n.d. [1954].
 Maxine Workman, Minnesota Cemeteries, Polk County. West Fargo, ND: Red River Genealogy Society, 1988.

External links
 Polk County official website

 
Minnesota counties
Greater Grand Forks
1872 establishments in Minnesota
Populated places established in 1872